Elijeu De Jesus Belo Soares or De Jesus (born August 10, 1987) is a football player. He is the current defender for the Timor-Leste national football team.

References

External links
De Jesus

1987 births
Living people
East Timorese footballers
Association football defenders
Timor-Leste international footballers
F.C. Porto Taibesi players